Azam al-Sadat Farahi (born c. 1958) is an Iranian teacher who is married to former Iranian president Mahmoud Ahmadinejad.

Farahi was never seen campaigning for her husband, however she has made rare public appearances including giving a speech in 2009 forum of wives of heads of state at the Rome headquarters of the U.N. Food and Agriculture Organization.

References

Mahmoud Ahmadinejad
Iranian schoolteachers
Iran University of Science and Technology alumni
1958 births
Living people
Wives of presidents of Iran
Place of birth missing (living people)